The Christadelphian is a Bible magazine published monthly by The Christadelphian Magazine and Publishing Association (CMPA). It states that it is 'A magazine dedicated wholly to the hope of Israel' and, according to the magazine website, it 'reflects the teachings, beliefs and activities of the Christadelphians'. The magazine's office is located in Hall Green, Birmingham, England.

History
The Christadelphian magazine started life as The Ambassador of the Coming Age in 1864, edited by Robert Roberts. It ran as The Ambassador of the Coming Age until 1869, when the name was changed to The Christadelphian. Subsequent editors include C.C. Walker (editor from 1898–1937), John Carter (1937–1962), Louis Sargent, Alfred Nicholls, Michael Ashton and presently Andrew Bramhill.

Content
The magazine contains a wide variety of articles, including exhortations from Breaking of Bread services, studies of Biblical characters, articles on Christian living, reviews of Bible related books/DVDs/etc., and comment on relevant current events in relation to Bible prophecy. Items for publication are produced by potentially any Christadelphian, pending the editorial process. At the back of the magazine is a section in which is printed news from each ecclesia including baptisms, deaths and ecclesial events.

Publisher
The publisher of the magazine is The Christadelphian Magazine and Publishing Association (CMPA), based in Hall Green, Birmingham. All members of the committee are active members of Christadelphian congregations in the UK subscribing to the Birmingham Amended Statement of Faith (BASF). Subscriptions and previews of the magazine are available on The Christadelphian website.

Other publications
Back issues (from 1864–2000) are available from the CMPA on CD-ROM and from 2001 to 2010 as a downloadable PDF; and an audio edition of The Christadelphian (2006 onwards) is available on cassette, audio and MP3 CD. In addition to the magazine, other literature is published by the CMPA, including edited reprints of articles already published in The Christadelphian; for example:

 The Letter to the Hebrews by John Carter - a study on the Letter to the Hebrews, that first appeared as articles in The Christadelphian from 1933-1935.
 Portrait of the Saint by John Marshall - a study on the Letter to the Ephesians, the majority of which first appeared as articles in The Christadelphian from 1966-1967.
 Chronicles of the Kings by Michael Ashton - a study on the Books of Chronicles, that first appeared as articles in The Christadelphian from 1998-2000.

A complete list of books is available on the website. In addition, a number of reviews of these books (previously published in The Christadelphian and The Testimony magazines) are available, together with a large selection of e-books available to download.

Faith Alive!, a magazine aimed at 16-25 year olds, has been published since 1978.

The CMPA also publishes a number of booklets detailing various Christadelphians beliefs; for example: -
 Jesus: God the Son or Son of God? Does the Bible teach the Trinity (by Fred Pearce).
 The Miracle of the Bible: The Word of God in Print (by Reg Carr).
 Getting to Know God: What the Bible Reveals (by Fred Pearce).

Most of these pamphlets are available for viewing or printing off for personal use on The Christadelphian website. Over time the complete set will be made available, as each is reprinted. They can also be ordered online from the same website.

References

External links
 The Christadelphian magazine homepage

Christadelphian, The